The 1950 Cal Aggies football team represented the College of Agriculture at Davis—now known as the University of California, Davis—as a member of the Far Western Conference (FWC) during the 1950 college football season. Led by second-year head coach Ted Forbes, the Aggies compiled an overall record of 3–5 with a mark of 3–1 in conference play, placing second in the FWC title. The team was outscored by its opponents 150 to 119 for the season. The Cal Aggies played home games at Aggie Field in Davis, California.

Schedule

Notes

References

Cal Aggies
UC Davis Aggies football seasons
Cal Aggies football